Rodolph William Austin (born 1 June 1985) is a Jamaican professional footballer who plays as a midfielder. 

He is renowned as a tough tackling central midfielder who can play in attacking and central midfield as well as a central defender.

He began his career at Portmore United, where he won two Jamaica National Premier League titles and the CFU Club Championship. In 2008, he moved to Norway's Brann, contesting four Tippeligaen seasons before moving to Leeds United in July 2012. He spent three seasons at the Championship club, scoring eight goals in 101 appearances, and briefly captained the side.

Austin is captain of the Jamaica national team, for whom he debuted in 2004. He was part of their squads in three victorious Caribbean Cup tournaments, as well as three CONCACAF Gold Cups and the 2015 Copa América.

Club career

Portmore United
Austin started his career at Portmore United in Jamaica, scoring six goals in 75 appearances whilst winning the two domestic league titles and the CFU Club Championship.

Brann
An attempt by Stoke City to bring Austin to the club failed in August 2008, when he was refused a work permit on appeal. Austin went on to sign a one-year loan deal with Brann, after an agreement was reached between Brann, Portmore United and Stoke. Stoke would have the option to buy the player until 1 February 2009, and if they opted not to buy the player, Brann would have the option to buy until 30 June.

Austin made his Brann debut in the 1–3 defeat against Bodø/Glimt on 31 August 2008, coming on as a substitute in the last 20 minutes. He debuted in European competition three weeks later with a 2–0 win against Deportivo de La Coruña in the UEFA Cup. Stoke didn't activate their option because Austin couldn't get a work permit in England, and on 27 February 2009, Austin signed a four-year deal with Brann in a transfer worth £1,000,000.

In January 2011, Austin was subject to a bid from Queens Park Rangers under manager Neil Warnock after a trial spell at the club, however Brann rejected the bid. After playing 25 matches and scoring seven goals during the 2011 season, Austin won the SK Brann Player of the Season award. He also won the NISO Award as the best player in the 2011 Tippeligaen.

On 13 July 2012, Austin was linked with a move to Leeds United, where Warnock was now in charge after being sacked by QPR in 2011, and Leeds were said to have had a £200,000 bid rejected. Austin revealed he was hoping the move would be completed, revealing that former Leeds player and former Brann teammate Eirik Bakke was a big influence on his desire to join the club. Austin scored a long range effort against Aalesund on 22 July to help earn SK Brann a 2–1 victory, with Austin picking up his 5th booking of the season and as a result a one match ban he revealed it would be his last game for the club.

Leeds United

2012–13 season
On 23 July, SK Brann revealed they had accepted a bid from Leeds United for Austin. Leeds United confirmed the transfer later that day, subject to Austin successfully obtaining a work permit. Austin was given the number 8 shirt at Leeds United for the 2012–13 season.

Austin made his competitive début for Leeds in the first game of the season against Shrewsbury Town in the League Cup on 11 August, followed by a league début for Leeds in their 1–0 victory against Wolverhampton Wanderers. His first goal of for the club came in August 2012 in a League Cup match against Oxford United, his first league goal coming against Cardiff City from a free kick in September 2012. Austin scored a further League Cup goal in Leeds' 2–1 victory against Premiership side Everton in the same month. After picking up an injury on international duty, Austin was rested for the match against Charlton Athletic on 23 October.

In a game against Watford in November of the same year, following his stretchering off due to what was initially suspected as broken a leg the game saw Leeds go down to 9 men, with Jason Pearce having already received a red card for Leeds. Scans after the game revealed Austin had not broken his leg but had however cracked his ankle bone and would be ruled out for several months.

Austin returned from injury several months ahead of schedule when he came back into the starting line-up against Nottingham Forest on 26 December. Austin scored an own goal in a 4–2 loss. Austin was sent off for an elbow on Ashley Barnes in Leeds 2–1 loss against Brighton & Hove Albion on 27 April. The subsequent three match ban meant that Austin missed the first two matches of the 2013–14 season.

2013–14 season
After missing the first two games of the season through suspension, Austin was named the new permanent captain of Leeds United on 11 August 2013 after returning to the side from suspension against Leicester City, replacing previous captain Lee Peltier. Austin received the Man of The Match Award in the same game for his impressive performance. Upon being named the new captain, Austin spoke of the role being a "big honour".

After a shock 2–0 FA Cup defeat against Rochdale on 4 January 2014 and then a 6–0 defeat against Sheffield Wednesday, on 11 January Austin spoke with the club manager Brian McDermott and decided to step down as the club captain; the captaincy was handed over to Ross McCormack.

2014–15 season
On 1 August, Austin was assigned the Leeds number 4 shirt for the 2014–15 season. On 20 September, Austin scored his first goal of the season in a 3–0 win over local rivals Huddersfield Town. His second goal of the season came from a penalty in the 1–1 draw against Bolton Wanderers on 10 January 2015. On 2 February 2015, transfer deadline day, Leeds put out a statement after significant interest from clubs including Wigan Athletic that Austin would not be sold and would be staying at the club, with Austin also expressing his desire to stay at Leeds.

On 28 February 2015, Austin scored a long range volley for Leeds in a 3–2 defeat against Watford. On 4 April, Austin was given a straight red card and a three-game ban for an off the ball incident against Blackburn Rovers in a 3–0 defeat.

On 2 May 2015, Austin won the Goal Of The Season award at Leeds United's official end of 2014–15 season awards ceremony for his strike against Watford. On 13 May 2015, Austin's contract was not renewed by Leeds United and he was released by the club.

Work permit denied
On 30 July 2015, after agreeing a three-year deal with Sheffield Wednesday, it was revealed that the move was cancelled as Austin was not to be given a work permit due to new Football Association rules, wherein a non-European Union player has to represent a country in FIFA's top 50 rankings over the two years prior. Austin's agent Darryl Powell described the situation as "traumatic", since Austin's wife and young son live in England.

Brøndby IF
After being denied work permit for England, Austin signed with the Danish side Brøndby, on a two-year contract. He left the club as his contract expired in the summer of 2017.

Esbjerg fB
After leaving Brøndby, Austin signed for newly relegated Danish 1st Division club Esbjerg on 16 July 2017. He signed a two-year contract and got shirt number 8. After four years in Esbjerg, Austin left the club at the end of the 2020-21 season.

International career
Austin has featured for Jamaica U20, U23 and senior national teams since 2005. He won the Caribbean Cup with Jamaica in 2008, again in 2010, and again in 2014. He was named Most Valuable Player for the tournament in 2010 and 2014.

Austin scored a freekick in a famous victory for Jamaica against USA on 7 September 2012, to help earn Jamaica a historic 2–1 victory to beat the United States for the first time in 19 matches.

He won the Caribbean Cup for the third time, and his second MVP award, as Jamaica captain in the 2014 edition, scoring the winning goal in a 4–3 penalty shootout victory over Trinidad and Tobago.

Austin captained Jamaica at the 2015 Copa América, their first entry into the South American championship. He played every minute of their campaign, as they were eliminated from the group stage, losing all three matches and not scoring, including facing Lionel Messi in Jamaica's 1–0 defeat against Argentina, a game which saw Messi win his 100th Cap for Argentina.

Later in 2015, he captained Jamaica to their first ever final of the Gold Cup, scoring one goal in the process, before losing 3–1 to Mexico in the final.

In the 2016 Copa Americana, Austin received a straight red in the opening game vs. Venezuela after a harsh challenge in the 24th minute.

In media
Austin also featured in Brann's 2011 Cup final song by Fjorden Baby!. The song was a remake of the song World In Motion by English band New Order. Austin rapped the part that was made famous by Jamaican-born England international. John Barnes.

Career statistics

International goals
Scores and results list Jamaica's goal tally first.

Honours
Verdens Gang Norwegian Premier League Player of the Year: 2011

References

External links

1985 births
Living people
People from Clarendon Parish, Jamaica
Jamaican footballers
Jamaica youth international footballers
Jamaica international footballers
Jamaican expatriate footballers
Association football midfielders
Portmore United F.C. players
SK Brann players
Leeds United F.C. players
Brøndby IF players
Esbjerg fB players
Eliteserien players
English Football League players
Danish Superliga players
2009 CONCACAF Gold Cup players
2011 CONCACAF Gold Cup players
2014 Caribbean Cup players
2015 Copa América players
2015 CONCACAF Gold Cup players
Copa América Centenario players
Expatriate footballers in Norway
Expatriate footballers in England
Expatriate men's footballers in Denmark
Jamaican expatriate sportspeople in Norway
Jamaican expatriate sportspeople in England
National Premier League players